Muhammad Alwi Slamat  (born 16 December 1998) is an Indonesian professional footballer who plays for Liga 1 club Persebaya Surabaya as a midfielder, he can also operate as a full-back.

International career
In 2016, Alwi Slamat represented the Indonesia U-19, in the 2016 AFF U-19 Youth Championship.

Career statistics

Club

Honours

Club
PS TNI U-21
 Indonesia Soccer Championship U-21: 2016
PSMS Medan
 Liga 2 runner-up: 2017
Persebaya Surabaya
 Liga 1 runner-up: 2019
 Indonesia President's Cup runner-up: 2019
 East Java Governor Cup: 2020

References

External links
 
 

1996 births
Living people
Indonesian footballers
People from Tulehu
Semen Padang F.C. players
PS TIRA players
PSMS Medan players
Persebaya Surabaya players
Liga 1 (Indonesia) players
Liga 2 (Indonesia) players
Sportspeople from Maluku (province)
Indonesia youth international footballers
Association football midfielders
Association football defenders